Arackal  is a village in Kollam district in the state of Kerala, India.

Demographics

As of the 2011 Census of India, Arackal had a population of 16739 with 7964 males and 8776 females.

References

Villages in Kollam district